Jenny Hansson, born 26 August 1980, is a Swedish former cross-country skier who competed between 2002 and 2013. Her best World Cup finish was third in the 4 × 5 km relay in Sweden in November 2008. Hansson's best individual finish was 39th in a 10 km event in Switzerland in 2007. She won Birkebeinerrennet in 2010, and in 2011 she won the women's race in the ski marathon Vasaloppet. In 2011, she won Tjejvasan.

She announced her retirement from cross-country skiing on 31 May 2013.

Cross-country skiing results
All results are sourced from the International Ski Federation (FIS).

World Cup

Season standings

Team podiums
 1 podium – (1 )

References

External links

1980 births
Living people
Swedish female cross-country skiers
21st-century Swedish women